= Victory House =

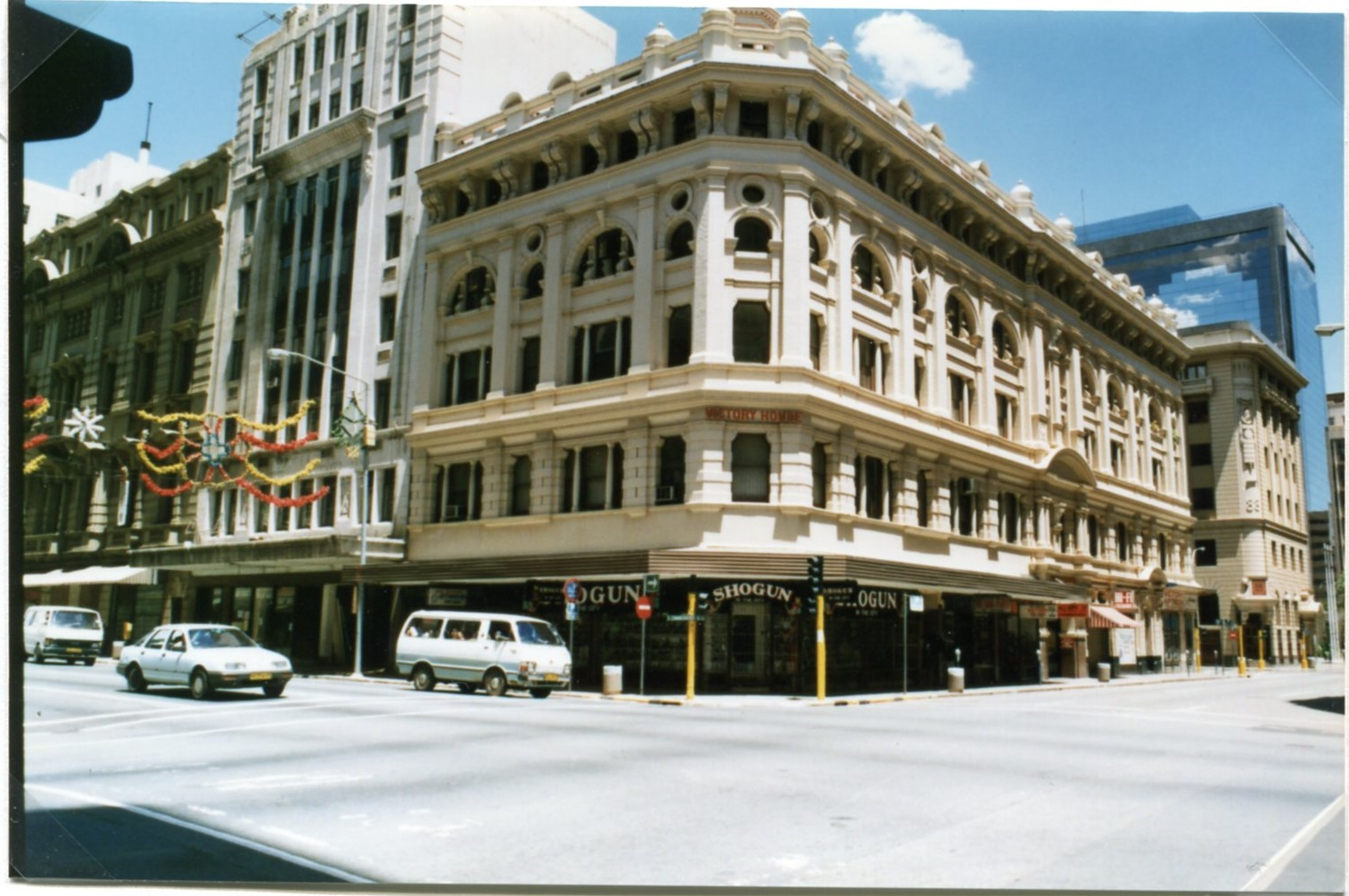
- Victory House at Harrison, Fox and Commissioner Streets, in Marshallstown Johannesburg in 1986
- Interactive map of the Victory House area

General information
- Status: Completed
- Type: Office use
- Location: Johannesburg, South Africa
- Completed: 1897

Height
- Roof: 102 metres (335 ft)

Technical details
- Floor count: 5

Design and construction
- Architect: W H Stucke

Victory House, originally known as Permanent Buildings, is located on the corner of Harrison and Fox Streets in Marshalltown. The building is of great historical and architectural significance and is famous for having Johannesburg's first lift.

== History ==
The building was originally built and named Permanent Building by the South African Permanent Mutual and Investment Society which was founded in Kimberley in November 1883, the objective being to assist people of small means to acquire their own property, and to provide facilities for the deposit of savings where they could earn interest. The first branch opened in Johannesburg in 1889 and moved into the new five storey building, now called Victory House, in 1897.

== Design ==
Victory House is the earliest example of Stucke's work. It is described as a bold, proud, and handsome classical building. In Victory House, Stucke combined and adapted various elements of different styles so skilfully that they can hardly be recognised, and thus formed a new composition in the so-called Creative Eclectic Style – an expression of the Victorian desire for a new style to meet the challenges of a new era. The building has many typical features of a Colonial Victorian building including corrugated iron roofing, decorative wrought iron ornamentation, and red brickwork. Whilst the brickwork has been painted over, the outline is still visible.

== Construction ==
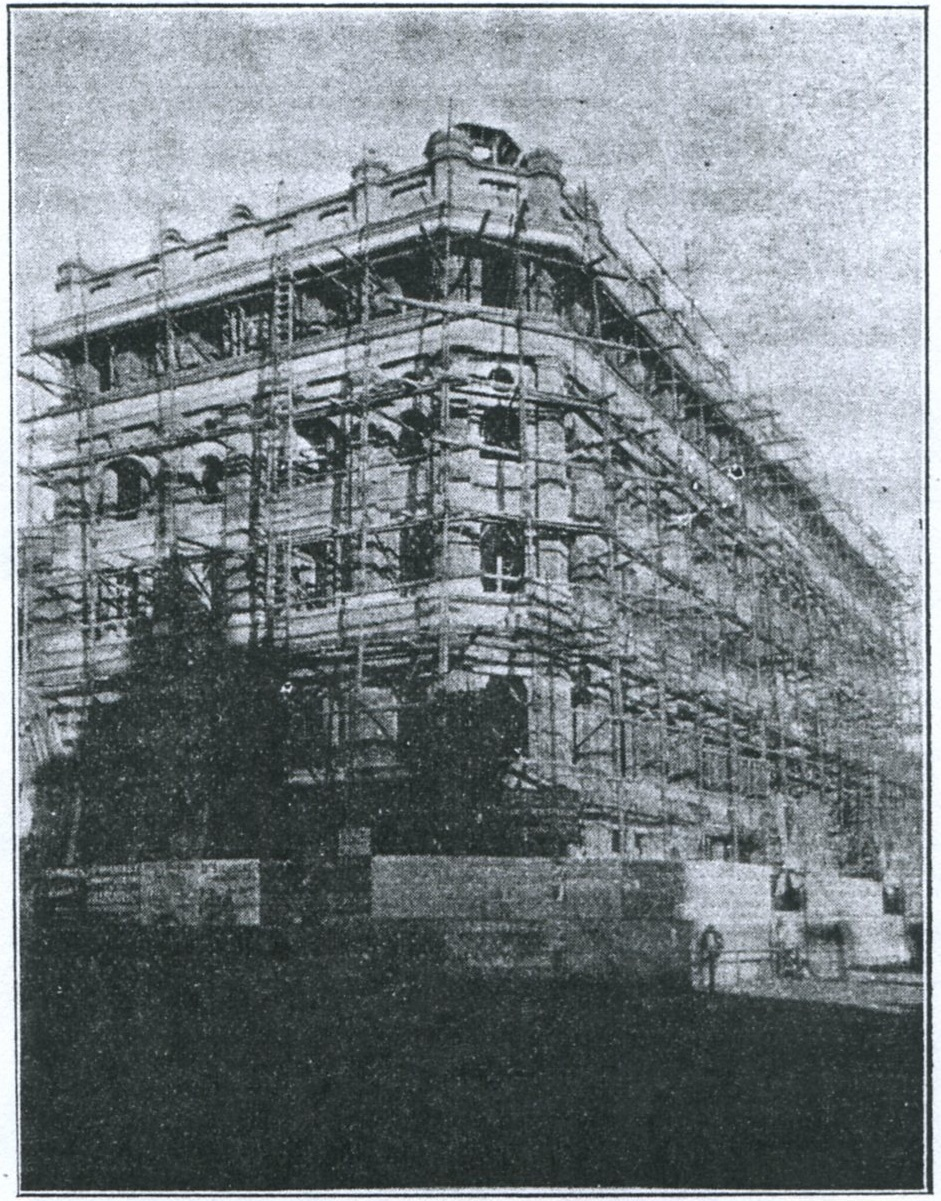
Victory House in 1897 while still under construction

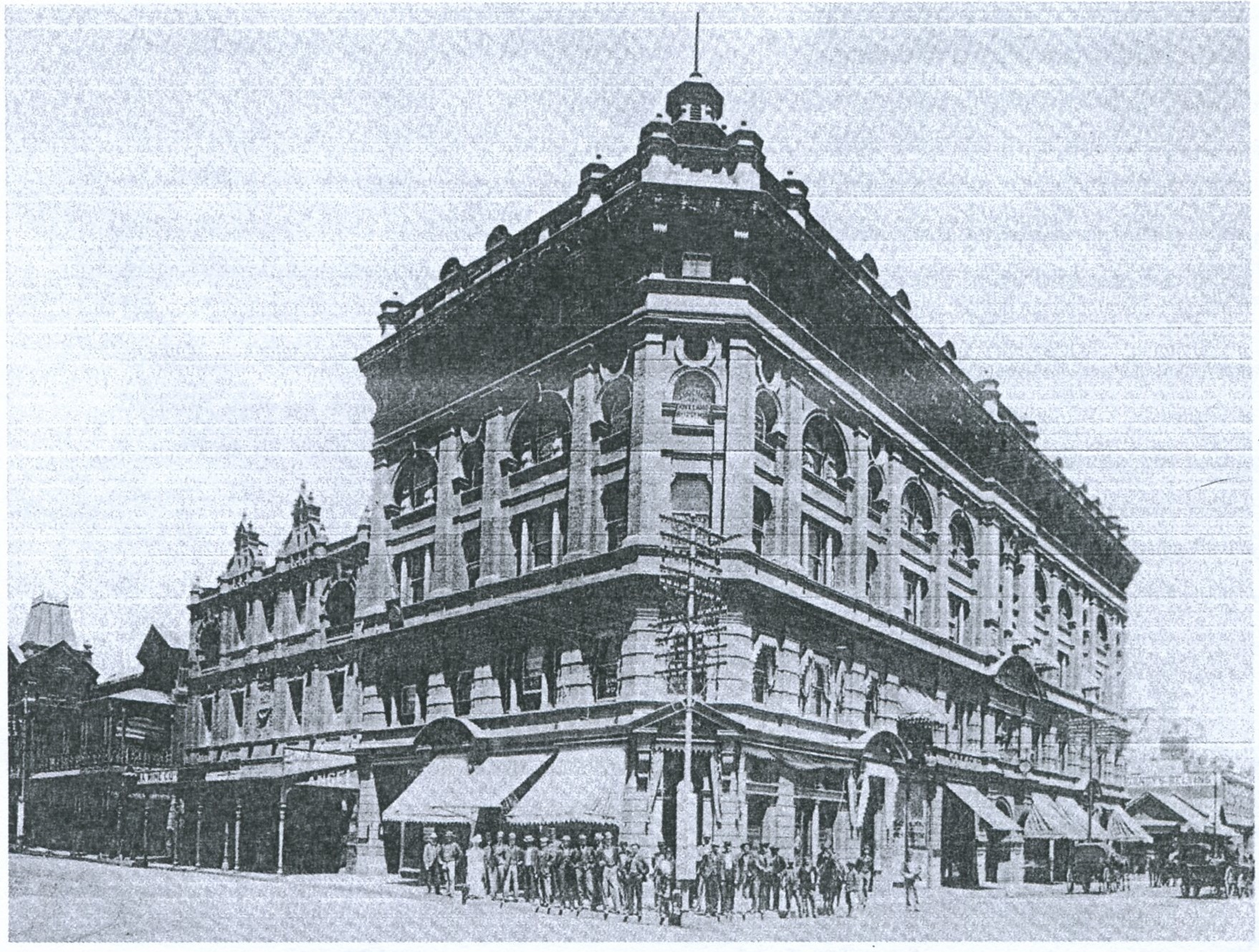
Victory House in 1898 right after the installation of its famous lift

Built just before the South African War, Victory House is the epitome of a Late Victorian commercial structure. It was the most prestigious building in Johannesburg and was the first to have a lift which had crowds gaping for weeks. The lift was a technological marvel, complete with a safety apparatus; it also boasted a polished oak cage and an upholstered seat. The lift was supplied by R Waygood of England. An early letter to the lift firm references the employment of a caretaker and the purchase of a bag of coal to operate the boiler which worked the hydraulic lift. The total cost of the original lift, boiler and engine was £1,020. The staircase was made of cast iron, also made in England it was the first fireproof staircase in Johannesburg.

Historian Eric Rosenthal, whose father had his offices at Permanent Buildings, wrote of his father's encounter with Gandhi on the day the caretaker-cum-operator refused to convey Gandhi in the lift. Gandhi would not demean himself as to walk when the European was carried in the lift.
